Gene Rodman Wolfe (May 7, 1931 – April 14, 2019) was an American science fiction and fantasy writer. He was noted for his dense, allusive prose as well as the strong influence of his Catholic faith. He was a prolific short story writer and novelist, and won many literary awards. Wolfe has been called "the Melville of science fiction", and was honored as a Grand Master by the Science Fiction and Fantasy Writers of America.

Wolfe is best known for his Book of the New Sun series (four volumes, 1980–1983), the first part of his "Solar Cycle". In 1998, Locus magazine ranked it the third-best fantasy novel published before 1990 based on a poll of subscribers that considered it and several other series as single entries.

Personal life
Wolfe was born in New York City, the son of Mary Olivia and Emerson Leroy Wolfe. He had polio as a small child. He and his family moved to Houston when he was 6, and he went to high school and college in Texas, attending Lamar High School in Houston. While attending Texas A&M University, he published his first speculative fiction in The Commentator, a student literary journal.

Wolfe dropped out during his junior year and subsequently was drafted to fight in the Korean War. After returning to the United States, he earned a degree from the University of Houston and became an industrial engineer. He was a senior editor on the staff of the journal Plant Engineering for many years before retiring to write full-time, but his most famous professional engineering achievement is a contribution to the machine used to make Pringles potato chips.

Wolfe lived in Barrington, Illinois, a suburb of Chicago, with his wife Rosemary, where they raised four children. Wolfe also has three granddaughters. The Wolfes moved to Peoria, Illinois in 2013. Wolfe underwent double bypass surgery on April 24, 2010. Wolfe also underwent cataract surgery on his right eye in early 2013. Wolfe's wife, Rosemary, died on December 14, 2013, after a series of illnesses, including Alzheimer's disease. Wolfe said, "There was a time when she did not remember my name or that we were married, but she still remembered that she loved me."

Wolfe died at his Peoria home from cardiovascular disease on April 14, 2019, at the age of 87.

Literary works
Wolfe's first published book was the paperback original novel Operation Ares (Berkley Medallion, 1970). He first received critical attention for The Fifth Head of Cerberus (Scribner's, 1972), which examines "colonial mentality within an orthodox science fiction framework". It was published in German and French-language editions within the decade.

His best-known and most highly regarded work is the multi-volume novel The Book of the New Sun. Set in a bleak, distant future influenced by Jack Vance's Dying Earth series, the story details the life of Severian, a journeyman torturer, exiled from his guild for showing compassion to one of the condemned. The novel is composed of the volumes The Shadow of the Torturer (1980), The Claw of the Conciliator (1981; winner of the Nebula Award for Best Novel), The Sword of the Lictor (1982), and The Citadel of the Autarch (1983). A coda, The Urth of the New Sun (1987), wraps up some loose ends but is generally considered a separate work. Several of Wolfe's essays about writing the Book of the New Sun series were published in The Castle of the Otter (1982; the title refers to a misprint of the fourth book's title in Locus magazine).

In 1984, Wolfe retired from his engineering position and was then able to devote more time to his writing. In the 1990s, Wolfe published two more works in the same universe as The Book of the New Sun. The first, The Book of the Long Sun, consists of the novels Nightside the Long Sun (1993), Lake of the Long Sun (1994), Caldé of the Long Sun (1994), and Exodus From the Long Sun (1996). These books follow the priest of a small parish as he becomes wrapped up in political intrigue and revolution in his city-state. Wolfe then wrote a sequel, The Book of the Short Sun, composed of On Blue's Waters (1999), In Green's Jungles (2000), and Return to the Whorl (2001), dealing with colonists who have arrived on the sister planets Blue and Green. The four Sun works (The Book of the New Sun, The Urth of the New Sun, The Book of the Long Sun, and The Book of the Short Sun) are often referred to collectively as the "Solar Cycle".

Wolfe also wrote many stand-alone books. His first novel, Operation Ares, was published by Berkley Books in 1970 and was unsuccessful. He subsequently wrote two novels held in particularly high esteem, Peace and The Fifth Head of Cerberus. The first is the seemingly-rambling narrative of Alden Dennis Weer, a man of many secrets who reviews his life under mysterious circumstances. The Fifth Head of Cerberus is either a collection of three novellas or a novel in three parts, dealing with colonialism, memory, and the nature of personal identity. The first story, which gives the book its name, was nominated for the Nebula Award for Best Novella.

Style

Wolfe's writing frequently relies on the first-person perspectives of unreliable narrators. He said: "Real people really are unreliable narrators all the time, even if they try to be reliable narrators." The causes for the unreliability of his characters vary. Some are naive, as in Pandora by Holly Hollander or The Knight; others are not particularly intelligent (There Are Doors); Severian, from The Book of the New Sun, tells his story from perspective of his younger, ignorant self; and Latro of the Soldier series suffers from amnesia.

Wolfe wrote in a letter, "My definition of a great story has nothing to do with 'a varied and interesting background.' It is: One that can be read with pleasure by a cultivated reader and reread with increasing pleasure." In that spirit, Wolfe also left subtle hints and lacunae that may never be explicitly referred to in the text. For example, a backyard full of morning glories is an intentional foreshadowing of events in Free Live Free, but is apparent only to a reader with a horticultural background, and a story-within-the-story provides a clue to understanding Peace.

Wolfe's language can also be a subject of confusion for the new reader. In the appendix to The Shadow of the Torturer, he says:

In rendering this book—originally composed in a tongue that has not achieved existence—into English, I might easily have saved myself a great deal of labor by having recourse to invented terms; in no case have I done so. Thus in many instances I have been forced to replace yet undiscovered concepts by their closest twentieth-century equivalents. Such words as peltast, androgyn, and exultant are substitutions of this kind, and are intended to be suggestive rather than definitive.

This character of the fictional "translator" of his novel provides a certain insight into Wolfe's writing: all of his terms—fuligin, carnifex, thaumaturge, and so on—are real words.

Reception
Although he was not a best-selling author, Wolfe is highly regarded by critics and fellow writers. He was often considered to be not only one of the greatest science fiction authors, but one of the best American writers regardless of genre. In 2003, award-winning science fiction author Michael Swanwick said: "Gene Wolfe is the greatest writer in the English language alive today. Let me repeat that: Gene Wolfe is the greatest writer in the English language alive today! I mean it. Shakespeare was a better stylist, Melville was more important to American letters, and Charles Dickens had a defter hand at creating characters. But among living writers, there is nobody who can even approach Gene Wolfe for brilliance of prose, clarity of thought, and depth in meaning."

Among others, writers Neil Gaiman and Patrick O'Leary have credited Wolfe for inspiration. O'Leary has said: "Forget 'Speculative Fiction.' Gene Wolfe is the best writer alive. Period. And as Wolfe once said, 'All novels are fantasies. Some are more honest about it.' No comparison. Nobody – I mean nobody – comes close to what this artist does." O'Leary also wrote an extensive essay concerning the nature of Wolfe's artistry, entitled "If Ever A Wiz There Was", originally published in his collection Other Voices, Other Doors. Ursula K. Le Guin is frequently quoted on the jackets of Wolfe's books as having said "Wolfe is our Melville."

Critic and science fiction writer Harlan Ellison, reviewing The Shadow of the Torturer, wrote: "Gene Wolfe is engaged in the holy chore of writing every other author under the table. He is no less than one of the finest, most original writers in the world today. His work is singular, hypnotizing, startlingly above comparison. The Shadow of the Torturer breaks new ground in American literature and, as the first novel of a tetralogy, casts a fierce light on what will certainly be a lodestone landmark, his most stunning work to date. It is often said, but never more surely than this time: This book is not to be missed at peril of one's intellectual enrichment."

Wolfe's fans regard him with considerable dedication, and one Internet mailing list (URTH, begun in November 1996) dedicated to his works amassed over ten years and thousands of pages of discussion and explication. Similarly, much analysis and exegesis has been published in fanzine and small-press form (e.g. Lexicon Urthus ).

When asked the "Most overrated" and "Most underrated" authors, Thomas M. Disch identified Isaac Asimov and Gene Wolfe, respectively, writing: "...all too many have already gone into a decline after carrying home some trophies. The one exception is Gene Wolfe...Between 1980 and 1982 he published The Book of the New Sun, a tetralogy of couth, intelligence, and suavity that is also written in VistaVision with Dolby Sound. Imagine a Star Wars–style space opera penned by G. K. Chesterton in the throes of a religious conversion. Wolfe has continued in full diapason ever since, and a crossover success is long overdue."

Michael Dirda included Wolfe's Book of the New Sun in his "Science Fiction Reading List", writing: "If Proust, while listening to late Beethoven string quartets, wrote I, Claudius and set it in the future, the result might resemble this measured, autumnal masterpiece."

Early in his writing career, Wolfe exchanged correspondence with J. R. R. Tolkien.

Awards
Wolfe won the World Fantasy Award for Life Achievement in 1996, a judged award at the annual World Fantasy Convention. He was inducted by the Science Fiction Hall of Fame in 2007. The Science Fiction and Fantasy Writers of America named him its 29th SFWA Grand Master in December 2012; the annual Damon Knight Memorial Grand Master Award was presented to Wolfe during Nebula Awards weekend, May 16–19, 2013.

He was Guest of Honor at the 1985 World Science Fiction Convention and he received the 1989 Edward E. Smith Memorial Award (or "Skylark") at the New England convention Boskone. In March 2012 he was presented with the first Chicago Literary Hall of Fame Fuller Award, for outstanding contribution to literature by a Chicago author. After his death, Wolfe was inducted into the Chicago Literary Hall of Fame in a ceremony on September 21, 2021.  Wolfe was the first Fuller Award recipient to be inducted; and though he was part of the 2019 class, the ceremony to honor him did not occur until 2021. 

He also won many awards for individual works:

Wolfe also amassed a long list of nominations in years when he did not win, including sixteen Nebula award nominations and eight Hugo Award nominations.

Works

This is a partial list of works by Wolfe, focusing on those which won awards.

Novels
The Book of the New Sun
The Shadow of the Torturer (1980) BSFA Award & World Fantasy Award winner, 1981; Nebula Award and John W. Campbell Award nominee, 1981 
The Claw of the Conciliator (1981) Nebula and Locus Fantasy winner, 1982; Hugo and World Fantasy Awards nominated, 1982 
The Sword of the Lictor (1982) Locus Fantasy and BFS Winner, 1983; Nebula and BSFA Awards nominee, 1982  Hugo and World Fantasy Awards nominee, 1983 
The Citadel of the Autarch (1983) John W. Campbell award winner, Nebula and BSFA nominee, 1984; Locus Fantasy nominee, 1983 
Free Live Free (1984) BSFA nominee, 1985; Nebula nominee, 1986 
The Urth of the New Sun (1987) Hugo, Nebula, and Locus SF Awards nominee, 1988 
The Soldier series
Soldier of the Mist (1986) Locus Fantasy winner, WFA nominee, 1987; Nebula nominee 1988 
Soldier of Arete (1989) Locus Fantasy and WFA nominee, 1990 
Soldier of Sidon (2006) World Fantasy Award winner, Locus Fantasy Award nominee, 2007 
There Are Doors (1988) Locus Fantasy nominee, 1989 
The Book of the Long Sun
Nightside the Long Sun (1993) Nebula nominee, 1994 
Lake of the Long Sun (1994)
Caldé of the Long Sun (1994) Nebula nominee, 1996 
Exodus From the Long Sun (1996)
The Book of the Short Sun
On Blue's Waters (1999)
In Green's Jungles (2000) Locus SF nominee, 2001 
Return to the Whorl (2001) Locus SF nominee, 2002 
The Wizard Knight
The Knight (2004) Nebula nominee, 2005 
The Wizard (2004) Locus Fantasy and World Fantasy Award nominated, 2005 
Pirate Freedom (2007) Locus Fantasy Award nominee, 2008 
An Evil Guest (2008)
The Sorcerer's House (2010)
 2011 Locus Fantasy nominee
Home Fires (2011)
The Land Across (2013)
A Borrowed Man (2015)
Interlibrary Loan (2020)

Story collections
 The Island of Doctor Death and Other Stories and Other Stories (1980) (The title story is "The Island of Doctor Death and Other Stories". Among others, the collection also includes "The Death of Dr. Island" and "The Doctor of Death Island". "The Death of Dr. Island" won the Nebula Award for Best Novella.)
 Gene Wolfe's Book of Days (1981)
 Storeys from the Old Hotel (1988) (winner of the World Fantasy Award for best collection)
 Endangered Species (1989)
 Castle of Days (1995)
 Strange Travelers (2001)
 Innocents Aboard (2005)
 Starwater Strains (2006)
 The Best of Gene Wolfe (2010)

Books about Gene Wolfe
Gene Wolfe (Starmont Reader's Guide, 29): Joan Gordon (Borgo Press, 1986, ; reprinted as a Special Publication of the Monterey Bay Aquarium Foundation, 2008), an annotated bibliography and criticism on Wolfe's science fiction and non-fiction writing
The Wizard Knight Companion: A Lexicon for Gene Wolfe's The Knight and The Wizard: Michael Andre-Driussi (Sirius Fiction, 2009), a dictionary of words and names from Wolfe's Wizard Knight novels
Lexicon Urthus: Michael Andre-Druissi (Sirius Fiction, 1994), a dictionary of the archaic words used by Wolfe in The Book of the New Sun
The Long and the Short of It: More Essays on the Fiction of Gene Wolfe: Robert Borski (iUniverse, Inc., 2006)
Solar Labyrinth: Exploring Gene Wolfe's "Book of the New Sun": Robert Borski (iUniverse, Inc., 2004)
Attending Daedalus: Gene Wolfe, Artifice, and the Reader: Peter Wright (Liverpool University Press, 2003): Study of The Book of the New Sun and The Urth of the New Sun
Shadows of the New Sun: Wolfe on Writing / Writers on Wolfe: Peter Wright (Liverpool University Press, 2007)
Strokes: John Clute (Serconia Press, 1988)
Gene Wolfe: An annotated bibliography and criticism on Wolfe's science fiction and non-fiction writing: Joan Gordon (Borgo Press, 2008)
 Gate of Horn, Book of Silk: A Guide to Gene Wolfe's The Book of the Long Sun and The Book of the Short Sun: Michael Andre-Driussi (Sirius Fiction, 2012)
 Shadows of the New Sun, an anthology of stories by other authors which are all explicitly based on Wolfe stories (TOR Books, 2013)
 Between Light and Shadow: An Exploration of the Fiction of Gene Wolfe, 1951-1986: Marc Aramini (Castalia House, 2015, ASIN B011YTDGY2), a comprehensive literary analysis of Wolfe's fiction from 1951 to 1986, volume 1 of 2.

Film adaptations
 The Death of Doctor Island, 35 mm short, 2008.

See also

Explanatory notes

References

External links

 
 
 
 

1931 births
2019 deaths
20th-century American male writers
20th-century American novelists
20th-century American short story writers
21st-century American male writers
21st-century American novelists
21st-century American short story writers
American fantasy writers
American male novelists
American male short story writers
American Roman Catholics
American science fiction writers
Constructed language creators
Converts to Roman Catholicism
Lamar High School (Houston, Texas) alumni
Nebula Award winners
Novelists from New York (state)
Novelists from Texas
People with polio
Postmodern writers
Rhysling Award for Best Long Poem winners
Roman Catholic writers
Science Fiction Hall of Fame inductees
SFWA Grand Masters
Texas A&M University alumni
University of Houston alumni
Weird fiction writers
World Fantasy Award-winning writers
Writers from Houston
Writers from New York City
Catholics from Texas